There are five high courts of Pakistan, each based in the capital city of the four provinces, plus one in the federal capital, Islamabad. Articles 192 to 203 of the Constitution of Pakistan outline the constitution of the courts, appointment of the judges, their oath of office, and jurisdiction of the high courts.

History 

At the time of partition in August 1947, the Lahore High Court, the Dhaka High Court, the Chief Court of Sind and the Judicial Commissioner's Court in the North-West Frontier Province were deemed to be the four high courts of Pakistan.

In 1955, the Dhaka High Court and the Lahore High Court became the High Court of East Pakistan and the High Court of West Pakistan, respectively. The West Pakistan High Court had benches at Karachi and Peshawar as well as circuit courts at Quetta (replacing the Judicial Commissioner in Balochistan) and Bahawalpur (replacing the High Court of Judicature at Baghdad-ul-Jadid).

As the province of West Pakistan was dissolved in 1970, three high courts were established: Lahore High Court, Peshawar High Court, and Sind and Balochistan High Court (with its principal seat at Karachi).

In 1976 the Sindh and Balochistan High Court was split into the High Court of Sind (Karachi) and the High Court of Balochistan (Quetta).

In 1985 the Lahore High Court had Benches at Bahawalpur, Multan and Rawalpindi; the High Court of Sind at Sukkur; the Peshawar High Court at Abbottabad and Dera Ismail Khan and the High Court of Baluchistan at Sibi.

In 2007, the government proposed a fifth high court to cover the Islamabad Capital Territory. This proposal was blocked by the Lahore High Court, but the decision was overturned by the Supreme Court of Pakistan on 24 December 2007. As a result of the 18th constitutional amendment, the Islamabad High Court was established in 2010. The amendment also established the Mingora Bench of the Peshawar High Court and the Turbat Bench of the High Court of Baluchistan.

List of high courts

Autonomous territories high courts

See also 
 District courts of Pakistan
 Anti Terrorism Court of Pakistan

References

External links
 
 
 
 
 

 
Court system of Pakistan